MQB can refer to:

Mira Quien Baila (U.S.), the 2010 edition of the United States version of Mira Quien Baila
¡Más que baile!, the Spanish version of the Mira Quien Baila reality TV show
Volkswagen Group MQB platform, automobile platforms produced by Volkswagen Group
Musée du quai Branly, the Musée du quai Branly, Paris